Paweł Głażewski (born 1 September 1982) is a Polish professional boxer who has challenged once for the WBA light-heavyweight title.

Amateur career
Głażewski was Polish Senior Champion in amateur boxing three times. In 2005, 2006 and 2008.

Professional career
Paweł Głażewski turned pro in 2007. When he won fight against Leo Tchoula, he won BBU International Champion. On August 18 he won WBC Baltic Silver belt. He stopped French boxer Abdelkader Benzinia.

Roy Jones vs. Paweł Głażewski

Jones was supposed to face Dawid Kostecki in a ten round bout at Atlas Arena, Poland on June 30. Days before the fight, Kostecki was convicted of being the ringleader of a criminal organization and was thrown in jail. Paweł Głażewski stepped in to fight Jones instead. Jones defeated the 17–0 Głażewski by split decision.

Jones was knocked down in round six. Many felt Głażewski deserved the decision in a close fight. Judges scored 96–93 96–94 for Jones, and 95–94 for Głażewski. Polish TV scored the fight 97–94 for Głażewski.

Professional boxing record

| style="text-align:center;" colspan="8"|23 Wins (5 knockouts, 18 decisions), 5 Losses (2 knockout, 3 decisions), 0 Draws
|-  style="text-align:center; background:#e3e3e3;"
|  style="border-style:none none solid solid; "|Res.
|  style="border-style:none none solid solid; "|Record
|  style="border-style:none none solid solid; "|Opponent
|  style="border-style:none none solid solid; "|Type
|  style="border-style:none none solid solid; "|Round
|  style="border-style:none none solid solid; "|Date
|  style="border-style:none none solid solid; "|Location
|  style="border-style:none none solid solid; "|Notes
|- align=center
|Loss
|align=center|23–5||align=left| Bartłomiej Grafka
|
|
|
|align=left|
|align=left|
|- align=center
|Loss
|align=center|23–4||align=left| Maciej Miszkin
|
|
|
|align=left|
|align=left|
|- align=center
|Loss
|align=center|23–3||align=left| Jürgen Brähmer
|
|
|
|align=left|
|align=left|
|- align=center
|Win
|align=center|23–2||align=left| Rowland Bryant
|
|
|
|align=left|
|align=left|  
|- align=center
|Win
|align=center|22–2||align=left| Maciej Miszkin
|
|
|
|align=left|
|align=left|  
|- align=center
|Win
|align=center|21–2||align=left| Andrei Salakhutdzinau
|
|
|
|align=left|
|align=left|  
|- align=center
|Loss
|align=center|20–2||align=left| Hadillah Mohoumadi
|
|
|
|align=left|
|align=left| 
|- align=center
|Win
|align=center|20–1||align=left| Bartlomiej Grafka
|
|
|
|align=left|
|align=left|  
|- align=center
|Win
|align=center|19–1||align=left| Oleksandr Garashchenko
|
|
|
|align=left|
|align=left|  
|- align=center
|Win
|align=center|18–1||align=left| Sofiane Sebihi
|
|
|
|align=left|
|align=left|
|- align=center
|Loss
|align=center|17–1||align=left| Roy Jones Jr.
|
|
|
|align=left|
|align=left| 
|- align=center
|Win
|align=center|17–0||align=left| Matthew Barney
|
|
|
|align=left|
|align=left| 
|- align=center
|Win
|align=center|16–0||align=left| Doudou Ngumbu
|
|
|
|align=left|
|align=left|
|- align=center
|Win
|align=center|15–0||align=left| Orial Kolaj
|
|
|
|align=left|
|align=left|
|- align=center
|Win
|align=center|14–0||align=left| Tomas Adamek
|
|
|
|align=left|
|align=left|
|- align=center
|Win
|align=center|13–0||align=left| Abdelkader Benzinia
|
|
|
|align=left|
|align=left|
|- align=center
|Win
|align=center|12–0||align=left| Tony Averlant
|
|
|
|align=left|
|align=left|
|- align=center
|Win
|align=center|11–0||align=left| Mounir Toumi
|
|
|
|align=left|
|align=left|
|- align=center
|Win
|align=center|10–0||align=left| Martial Bella Oleme
|
|
|
|align=left|
|align=left|
|- align=center
|Win
|align=center|9–0||align=left| 	Andrejs Tolstihs
|
|
|
|align=left|
|align=left|
|- align=center
|Win
|align=center|8–0||align=left| Leo Tchoula
|
|
|
|align=left|
|align=left|
|- align=center
|Win
|align=center|7–0||align=left| Steve Krökel
|
|
|
|align=left|
|align=left|
|- align=center
|Win
|align=center|6–0||align=left| Kirill Psonko
|
|
|
|align=left|
|align=left|
|- align=center
|Win
|align=center|5–0||align=left| Martins Kukulis
|
|
|
|align=left|
|align=left|
|- align=center
|Win
|align=center|4–0||align=left| Florians Strupits
|
|
|
|align=left|
|align=left|
|- align=center
|Win
|align=center|3–0||align=left| Mariusz Radziszewski
|
|
|
|align=left|
|align=left|
|- align=center
|Win
|align=center|2–0||align=left| Aleksandrs Dunecs
|
|
|
|align=left|
|align=left|
|- align=center
|Win
|align=center|1–0||align=left| Miroslav Kvocka
|
|
|
|align=left|
|align=left|
|- align=center

References

1982 births
Living people
Sportspeople from Białystok
Polish male boxers
Light-heavyweight boxers